Main Khiladi Tu Anari is a 1994 Indian action comedy film directed by Sameer Malkan. The screenplay is written by Sachin Bhowmick. Starring Akshay Kumar, Saif Ali Khan, Shilpa Shetty and Raageshwari in main lead roles, it also included Shakti Kapoor, Johnny Lever and Kader Khan in supporting roles. The film went on to become one of the top 5 highest-grossing movies of the year and was declared a box office success at the end of its theatrical run. The film is partly inspired by the 1991 movie The Hard Way.

The massive success of this film catapulted Akshay Kumar and Saif Ali Khan to the top rung of Bollywood's leading men and cemented their status as bankable stars, and as a successful pair following Yeh Dillagi (1994). Kumar in particular, who also had 1994 hits like Mohra, Suhaag, and Elaan, gained a considerable fan following, especially among the youth. He became renowned for his thrilling action scenes featuring martial arts and hand-to-hand combat; his daring stunts; his athletic dance moves and his rugged, macho good looks.

Khan's performance in the film earned him a Best Supporting Actor nomination at the 40th Filmfare Awards.

Plot
One of the most respected inspectors, Arjun Joglekar (Mukesh Khanna), is killed by drug dealer and gangster Goli (Shakti Kapoor). Mona (Shilpa Shetty), a cabaret singer and Goli's mistress, agrees to testify against Goli and is placed into witness protection by Inspector Karan (Akshay Kumar), Arjun's younger brother, who aims to fight any injustice and avenge his brother's murder. When Goli finds out about Mona's forthcoming testimony which would expose his real identity, he tracks her down and kills her and Karan, despite being present at the scene, is unable to do anything. Karan approaches the DCP (Kader Khan) for a warrant to arrest Goli but, the DCP refuses, saying it will be futile since Goli is an influential person.

Deepak Kumar (Saif Ali Khan), who is the most romantic actor around, is frustrated with his roles and for being type-cast as a romantic hero. He would like to do something different and bring some change and excitement to his dull and boring existence. To change his monotonous life, he gets drunk and drives around. He is arrested by the police and brought to his rowdy producer. Karan also arrives at the place to confront the producer for molesting a girl who had come to him earlier for a job. When the producer refuses to comply and calls goons to threaten Karan, the latter thrashes them all, impressing Deepak, who would like to study his behaviour so that he can use this as a background for his next movie.

Karan meets Basanti (also Shilpa Shetty), who looks identical to Mona. He tells Deepak that the latter can hang around him if Deepak can get Basanti to act as Mona. Deepak trains Basanti and presents the new "Mona" to Karan. Karan places Basanti at the Moonlight Hotel as an amnesiac Mona, where she can report on Goli's criminal activities. While Karan and Basanti fall in love with each other, Deepak falls in love with Karan's sister, Shivangi (Rageshwari), which makes Karan mad and he tries to get rid of Deepak and almost succeeds in doing so. However Deepak finds out and angrily confronts Karan, and leaves the house. Karan's sister is heartbroken; his sister-in-law makes him realize his wrongdoing. A remorseful Karan goes to Deepak and apologizes to him; Deepak forgives him and the two make up.

In the meanwhile, Goli has started seeing Karan as a thorn in his illegal activities and decides to have him killed. However, constable Ramlal (also Kader Khan), who is loyal to Karan, spots the assassin and takes the bullet. Karan is unable to save Ramlal, who dies in his arms making Karan even more determined to get Goli. Goli finds out the truth about Basanti, who tells him that Karan has already found some incriminating evidence against him and will be presenting it in the court. Goli calls Karan and tells him to hand over the evidence to him in exchange for Basanti's life. Deepak meets Goli to give him some films supposedly containing the evidence Goli wanted and tells him to hand over Basanti before Karan comes with the police to arrest him. However, Goli reveals to have also kidnapped Karan's sister and sister-in-law, much to Deepak's shock and dismay. Karan, who has been hiding with a gun some distance away, starts shooting at Goli and succeeds in gunning down many of his henchmen, while Deepak tries to escape with the three ladies in a car. But unfortunately for them, the car breaks down and Karan's location in also revealed, resulting in all of them getting captured. Goli holds Deepak, Basanti, Karan's sister and sister-in-law hostage and tortures Karan for the evidence. Karan pretends to faint and gets into a brutal fight with one of Goli's henchmen (the same one who killed his brother) and ultimately kills him. He then opens Deepak's bonds and a huge fight ensues between the duo and Goli and his cronies, which ends with Goli's death at Karan's hands.

In the end, everyone goes to watch Deepak's new movie. Halfway through the movie, Karan realizes that Deepak's dialogue resembles the same things he once himself had said to Deepak and walks away in a huff. Outside the hall, he meets Deepak and the two share a smoke with Deepak accidentally setting fire to his own pants but douses it immediately. The two friends share a laugh as the film ends and credits roll in.

Cast
 Akshay Kumar as Inspector Karan Joglekar 
 Saif Ali Khan as Deepak Kumar 
 Shilpa Shetty as Mona / Basanti  (dual role)
 Rageshwari as Shivangi Joglekar
 Shakti Kapoor as Goli 
 Kader Khan as Ram Lal / DCP (dual role)
 Goga Kapoor as Damodar
 Johny Lever as Dhansukh 
 Mukesh Khanna as Arjun Joglekar
 Raveena Tandon as herself (special appearance in the song "My Adorable Darling")
 Beena Banerjee as Seema Joglekar
 Anant Mahadevan as himself

Soundtrack
The music of the film was scored by Anu Malik. Singers Asha Bhosle, Kumar Sanu, Abhijeet Bhattacharya, Udit Narayan, Pankaj Udhas, Alka Yagnik, Anu Malik and Alisha Chinai rendered their voices in this album. The lyrics were penned by Rani Malik, Rahat Indori, Hasrat Jaipuri, Maya Govind, Zameer Kazmi and Anwar Sagar. "Churake Dil Mera" and "Zara Zara" were the most popular songs from the soundtrack. "Zuban Khamosh Hoti Hai" was picturised, but not included in the final version of the film. It became one of the best-selling Bollywood soundtrack albums of 1994, selling between 3.2million and 3.5million units.

Two songs from the soundtrack, "Chura Ke Dil Mera" and "Main Khiladi" were recreated in Hungama 2 and Selfiee, respectively.

Reception
It was the first Bollywood action film to be reviewed by martial arts film critic Albert Valentin on the now defunct Kung Fu Cinema site. He rated the film 3.5 out of 5 stars. He notes that, while the plot is largely borrowed from The Hard Way, Main Khiladi Tu Anari "kicks it up a notch due to the presence of one of India's biggest action stars, martial artist Akshay Kumar", comparing his martial arts skills to Jean-Claude Van Damme and praising his stuntwork, and concluding that it "is a fun action-comedy" film.

References

External links

1994 films
1990s Hindi-language films
Films scored by Anu Malik
1994 action comedy films
Indian action comedy films
Films with screenplays by Sachin Bhowmick